Rolling Stone is an American magazine focusing on popular culture.

Rolling Stone or Rolling Stones may also refer to:

Music
 The Rolling Stones, a rock band

Albums and EPs 

 The Rolling Stones (album), a 1964 album by the Rolling Stones
 The Rolling Stones (EP), a 1964 EP by the Rolling Stones
 Rollin' Stone, a 2012 album by Stevie Stone

Songs 
 "Rollin' Stone" (Muddy Waters song), 1950
 "Like a Rolling Stone", a 1965 song by Bob Dylan from the album Highway 61 Revisited
 "Rolling Stone" (Suzi Quatro song), 1972
 "Rolling Stone", a 1975 song by David Essex
 "Rolling Stone", a 2011 song by The Weeknd from the album Thursday

 "A Rolling Stone", 1980 song by Grace Jones

Other uses
 The Rolling Stone (magazine), a humorous weekly magazine founded in Austin, Texas in 1891 by William Sydney Porter, aka O. Henry.
 Rolling Stone (Uganda), newspaper
 Rolling stones or sailing stones, geological phenomenon
 The Rolling Stones (novel), 1952 novel by Robert A. Heinlein
 19383 Rolling Stones, asteroid
 Rolling Stone or Enflé, French card game

See also
 Rollingstone (disambiguation)
 "A rolling stone gathers no moss", proverb
 Rollin' Stoned, 2002 album by Kottonmouth Kings